Arthur Tudor Young (14 October 1901 – 26 February 1933) was an English rugby union scrum-half who played for both England and the British Lions. At 5 ft 4ins he was affectionately known as England's little man.

Personal history
Young was born in Darjeeling, India in 1901. As a child he moved to Britain and was educated at Tonbridge School before matriculating to Gonville and Caius College, Cambridge. On leaving education he joined the British Army, serving in the Royal Tank Corps. Later in his career he was Aide-de-camp to Sir Norman MacMullen while he was General Officer Commanding Eastern Command in India. While serving in India he contracted influenza and died in 1933 from pneumonia at the age of 31.

Rugby career
Young began playing rugby as a youth, turning out for Tunbridge School. On entering Cambridge he joined Cambridge University R.U.F.C. earning three sporting Blues when he faced Oxford in three Varsity matches between 1922-24. After leaving university he joined Blackheath F.C. and also represented Kent at county level. In 1924 he was selected for the England national team, facing Wales in the Five Nations Championship. Young went on to represent England on 18 occasions, scoring two tries. 1924 also saw Young selected for the British Lions on their 1924 British Lions tour to South Africa. He played in nine games of the tour and faced South Africa in the second Test in Johannesburg, which the Lions lost 17-0.

During his time in the British Army, Young represented the Army rugby team ten times between 1926 and 1929. Young was also a long-serving member of invitational touring side Barbarian F.C., first playing with the club in 1920, long before his international career started. He represented the Barbarians 12 times, his final match being against East Midlands in 1929.

Notes

1901 births
1933 deaths
English rugby union players
England international rugby union players
Rugby union scrum-halves
British & Irish Lions rugby union players from England
People educated at Tonbridge School
Blackheath F.C. players
Barbarian F.C. players
Cambridge University R.U.F.C. players
Royal Tank Regiment officers
Deaths from pneumonia in India
Alumni of Gonville and Caius College, Cambridge
Army rugby union players
20th-century British Army personnel
Kent County RFU players